The Nunc dimittis, also known as the Song of Simeon or the Canticle of Simeon, is a canticle taken from the second chapter of the Gospel of Luke, verses 29 through 32. Its Latin name comes from its incipit, the opening words, of the Vulgate translation of the passage, meaning "Now you let depart". Since the 4th century it has been used in services of evening worship such as Compline, Vespers, and Evensong.

Biblical account
The title is formed from the opening words in the Latin Vulgate, “Nunc dimittis servum tuum, Domine" ("Now thou dost dismiss thy servant, O Lord"). Although brief, the canticle abounds in Old Testament allusions. For example, "Because my eyes have seen thy salvation" alludes to Isaiah 52:10.

According to the narrative in Luke 2:25-32, Simeon was a devout Jew who had been promised by the Holy Spirit that he would not die until he had seen the Messiah. When Mary and Joseph brought the baby Jesus to the Temple in Jerusalem for the ceremony of redemption of the firstborn son (after the time of Mary's purification: at least 40 days after the birth, and thus distinct from the circumcision), Simeon was there, and he took Jesus into his arms and uttered words rendered variously as follows:

Versions

The "Nunc dimittis" passage in the original Koiné Greek:

Transliterated:

Latin (Vulgate):

English (Translation of the Vulgate):

English (Book of Common Prayer, 1662):

English (Roman Breviary):

The King James Version (1611) contains the same text as the Book of Common Prayer, except for the last line, which simply reads "A light to lighten the Gentiles, and the glory of thy people Israel."

Church Slavonic (in Slavonic)

Commentary

Friedrich Justus Knecht  draws the conclusion from this passage, that "belief in Jesus Christ drives away all fear of death." He writes:
Simeon now rejoiced at the prospect of death. Such a sensation was hitherto unknown in Israel. “Pious Israelites closed their eyes in death, weary of life and submissive to God’s will; not altogether hopeless, but full of horror of the future. Death was a thing to be feared, and each new day of life which was granted was looked on as a gain” (Grimm). But all at once every thing was changed. Holy Simeon had seen the Saviour, and was now ready to die joyfully. In fact, he did die very soon after; a pious tradition even goes so far as to say that he died before he left the Temple. He was thus the first to take the joyful news to Limbo that the Saviour was born and the day of salvation at hand.

Roger Baxter reflects on this passage in his Meditations, saying: "Oh that you would also bid farewell to all earthly things, and say with the Apostle, 'But I am straitened — having a desire to be dissolved, and to be with Christ.' (Phil. 1:23.)"

Liturgy and musical settings

The Nunc Dimittis is the traditional 'Gospel Canticle' of Night Prayer (Compline), just as Benedictus and Magnificat are the traditional Gospel Canticles of Morning Prayer and Evening Prayer respectively. Hence the Nunc Dimittis is found in the liturgical night office of many western denominations, including Anglican Evensong in the 1662 Book of Common Prayer, Compline (A Late Evening Service) in the 1928 Book of Common Prayer, and the Night Prayer service in the Common Worship, as well as both the Catholic and Lutheran service of Compline. In eastern tradition the canticle is found in Eastern Orthodox Vespers. One of the most well-known settings in England is a plainchant theme of Thomas Tallis.

Heinrich Schütz wrote at least two settings, one in Musikalische Exequien (1636), the other in Symphoniae sacrae II (1647). The feast day Mariae Reinigung was observed in the Lutheran Church at J.S. Bach's time. He composed several cantatas for the occasion, including Mit Fried und Freud ich fahr dahin, BWV 125, a chorale cantata on Martin Luther's paraphrase of the canticle, and Ich habe genug, BWV 82.

In many Lutheran orders of service the Nunc Dimittis may be sung following the reception of the Eucharist.

Many composers have set the text to music, usually coupled in the Anglican church with the Magnificat, as both the Magnificat and the Nunc dimittis are sung (or said) during the Anglican service of Evening Prayer according to the Book of Common Prayer, 1662, in which the older offices of Vespers (Evening Prayer) and Compline (Night Prayer) were deliberately merged into one service, with both Gospel Canticles employed. In Common Worship, it is listed among "Canticles for Use at Funeral and Memorial Services" Herbert Howells composed 20 settings of it, including Magnificat and Nunc dimittis (Gloucester) (1947) and Magnificat and Nunc dimittis for St Paul's Cathedral (1951). A setting of the Nunc dimittis by Charles Villiers Stanford was sung at the funeral of Margaret Thatcher as the recessional. Stanford wrote many settings of both the Magnificat and Nunc dimittis. 
Sergei Rachmaninoff wrote a setting of the Slavonic Nunc dimittis text, Ны́не отпуща́еши (Nyne otpushchayeshi), as the fifth movement of his All-Night Vigil. It is known for its final measures, in which the basses sing a descending scale ending on the B♭ below the bass clef. A setting by the British composer Geoffrey Burgon featured during the end credits of episodes in the 1979 television adaptation of Tinker Tailor Soldier Spy (TV series).

Literary settings
 Thomas Jefferson, Letter to Marquis de Lafayette (17 May 1816), Joseph Cabell (31 January 1821), and General Andrew Jackson (18 December 1823)
 T. H. White novel The Once and Future King – recitation by Merlyn
 T. S. Eliot poem A Song for Simeon (1928)
 Joseph Brodsky poem "Nunc Dimittis" (1972)
 Ezra Pound poem "Cantico del Sole" (1918)
 Karel Čapek play R.U.R.
 Roald Dahl short story "Nunc Dimittis" (1953–1979)
 Tanith Lee story "Nunc Dimittis" (1984–1986)
 Walter Miller, A Canticle for Leibowitz
 John le Carré novel A Murder of Quality
 John le Carré novel Tinker Tailor Soldier Spy – closing theme of TV adaptation
 John le Carré novel The Constant Gardener – sung at the funeral of Tessa Quayle
 H. W. Brands novel  The Strange Death of American Liberalism
 David Mitchell novel Cloud Atlas – "Pacific journal of Adam Ewing, part 1"
Edith Pargeter novel, writing as Ellis Peters in the 6th and 15th volumes of "The Cadfael Chronicles", The Virgin in the Ice and The Confession of Brother Haluin

See also

References

External links

List of available settings at Choral Public Domain Library.

Vulgate Latin words and phrases
Canticles
Latin-language Christian hymns
Christian prayer
Gospel of Luke
Nativity of Jesus in the New Testament
New Testament Latin words and phrases